Allohermenias is a genus of moths belonging to the subfamily Olethreutinae of the family Tortricidae.

Species 

 Allohermenias metarctia
 Allohermenias tenuitexta

See also
List of Tortricidae genera

References

Tortricidae genera
Olethreutinae